Raoyang County is county in the southeast of Hebei province, China, served by G45 Daqing–Guangzhou Expressway.

Administrative divisions
The county administers 4 towns and 3 townships.

Towns:
Raoyang, Dayincun, Wusong, Daguanting

Townships:
Wangtongyue Township, Liuchu Township, Dongliman Township

Climate

References

External links

County-level divisions of Hebei